Marcus Vinícius Oliveira de Almeida, also known as Buchecha (born January 8, 1990) is a Brazilian mixed martial artist and 1st-degree Brazilian jiu-jitsu (BJJ) practitioner.

A multiple-time World jiu-jitsu and ADCC submission fighting champion, Buchecha is a member of the IBJJF Hall of Fame and widely considered as one of the greatest Brazilian jiu-jitsu competitors of all time. In 2020 he announced his transition to mixed martial art, he currently competes in the Heavyweight division of ONE Championship.

Early life 
Almeida was born and grew up in Santos, São Paulo. His sister started training Brazilian jiu-jitsu when Marcus was 14 years old, forcing him to come along to the gym so their father Clayton could keep an eye on her. Subsequently, Marcus and Clayton started training jiu-jitsu also, leading both to become black belts and the latter winning IBJJF Masters World Championship. Almeida is a black belt under Rodrigo Cavaca, who gave Almeida his nickname Buchecha, which means cheek. Almeida competes under the Checkmat team.

Mixed martial arts career

ONE Championship
Despite talking about transitioning to mixed martial arts since 2015, news surfaced four years later on July 30, 2020, that Almeida had signed a multi-year contract with ONE Championship. He has been training mixed martial arts at the American Kickboxing Academy and has competed in the heavyweight division.

In August 2020, Almeida had to withdraw from an upcoming BJJ match with Fabrício Werdum due to a knee injury that has also delayed his MMA debut for ONE FC. Almeida was scheduled to make his MMA debut against Oumar Kane at ONE Championship. Unfortunately, Almeida was removed from the card and replaced with Alain Ngalani on 13th January, 2021, reportedly due to suffering an injury in training. After recovering from his injury, he was booked to make his MMA debut against Kang Ji-Won at ONE on TNT 1. Kang later withdrew from the bout for undisclosed reasons.

Almeida was scheduled to face Thomas Narmo at ONE Championship: Revolution on September 24, 2021. Narmo later withdrew for undisclosed reasons, and was replaced by Anderson “Braddock” Silva. He won the bout in the first round via north-south choke.

Almeida faced Kang Ji Won at ONE: Winter Warriors on December 3, 2021. He won the bout via rear-naked choke in the first round.

Almeida was scheduled to face Oumar "Reug Reug" Kane on April 22, 2022 at ONE 156. However, the week of the event, it was announced that the bout would be moved to May 20. Yet, Kane withdrew from the bout citing injury and was replaced by Hugo Cunha who in turn tested positive for COVID-19 and the bout was scrapped. Almeida was later rescheduled to face Simon Carson at ONE 158 on June 3, 2022. He won the fight by a first-round technical knockout, stopping Carson with ground and pound midway through the opening round.

Almeida faced Kirill Grishenko at ONE on Prime Video 1 on August 27, 2022. He won the bout early in the first round after submmiting Kirill with a heel hook. This win earned him the Performance of the Night award.

Championships and accomplishments

Brazilian jiu-jitsu / Submission wrestling 
Main Achievements (Black Belt):
 ADCC Submission Fighting World Champion (2013 / 2017)
 IBJJF World Champion (2012 / 2013 / 2014 / 2016 / 2017 / 2018 / 2019)
 IBJJF World No-Gi Champion (2010 / 2011)
 IBJJF Pan Champion (2012**)
 IBJJF Pro League Grand Prix Champion (2016)
 UAEJJF Abu Dhabi Pro Champion (2012 / 2013 / 2014 / 2015)
 2nd Place ADCC World Championship (2019)
 3rd Place IBJJF World Championship (2011)
 3rd Place ADCC World Championship (2017)

Mixed martial arts
 ONE Championship
 Performance of the Night (One time) 
 MMAjunkie.com
 2022 August Submission of the Month

Brazilian jiu-jitsu / submission wrestling record

Mixed martial arts record 

|-
| Win
| align=center|4–0
| Kirill Grishenko
| Submission (heel hook)
| ONE on Prime Video 1
| 
| align=center|1
| align=center|1:04 
| Kallang, Singapore
| 
|-
| Win
| align=center|3–0
| Simon Carson
| TKO (punches)
| ONE 158
| 
| align=center|1
| align=center| 2:24
| Kallang, Singapore
|
|-
|Win
|align=center|2–0
| Kang Ji Won
| Submission (rear-naked choke)
|ONE: Winter Warriors
|
|align=center|1
|align=center|2:27
|Kallang, Singapore
|
|-
|Win
|align=center|1–0
|Anderson Da Silva
|Submission (north-south choke)
|ONE Championship: Revolution
|
|align=center|1
|align=center|2:55
|Kallang, Singapore
|

Instructor lineage 
Carlos Gracie Sr. > Carlson Gracie > Élcio Figueiredo > Rodrigo Cavaca > Marcus Almeida

Notes

References

External links
 Marcus Almeida in BJJ Heroes
 Marcus Almeida on Martial Arts Ranking
 Marcus "Buchecha" Almeida on BJJ Stars
 

Brazilian practitioners of Brazilian jiu-jitsu
Brazilian male mixed martial artists
Mixed martial artists utilizing Brazilian jiu-jitsu
People awarded a black belt in Brazilian jiu-jitsu
Living people
1990 births
World Brazilian Jiu-Jitsu Championship medalists
World No-Gi Brazilian Jiu-Jitsu Championship medalists
IBJJF Hall of Fame inductees
Sportspeople from Santos, São Paulo
Brazilian jiu-jitsu practitioners who have competed in MMA (men)